Blastobasis lex is a moth in the family Blastobasidae. It is found in Costa Rica.

The length of the forewings is about 5.9 mm. The forewings are pale brown intermixed with brown scales. The hindwings are translucent pale brown.

Etymology
The specific name is derived from Latin legis (meaning a contract).

References

Moths described in 2013
Blastobasis